Enotourism, oenotourism, wine tourism, or vinitourism refers to tourism whose purpose is or includes the tasting, consumption or purchase of wine, often at or near the source. Where other types of tourism are often passive in nature, enotourism can consist of visits to wineries, tasting wines, vineyard walks, or even taking an active part in the harvest.

History
Enotourism is a relatively new form of tourism. Its history varies greatly from region to region, but in places such as the Napa Valley AVA and Wine Country, it saw heavy growth once a concerted marketing effort was implemented in 1975 that was given a further boost by the 1976 Judgment of Paris.

Other regions, such as Catalonia, Spain have only started marketing enotourism starting in the mid-2000s, primarily focusing on how it is an alternative form of tourism to the beach for which Spain is overall known.

There was also a rise in the profile of enotourism among English speakers with the 2004 release of the film, Sideways whose two central characters visit wineries and wine in the Santa Barbara region of Southern California.

Currently
The industry around enotourism has grown significantly throughout the first decade of the 21st century. In the United States 27 million travelers, or 17% of American leisure travelers, engaged in culinary or wine-related activities. In Italy the figure stands at approximately five million travelers, generating 2.5 billion euros in revenue.

"Enotourism Day" is celebrated on the second Sunday of November each year to promote cellar visits in Germany, Austria, Slovenia, Spain, France, Greece, Hungary, Italy, and Portugal. In North America, the first Wine Tourism Day was established for May 11, 2013 with events scheduled throughout the continent.

Chile has grown its enotourism industry in recent years, with several tourist routes being opened throughout the country, with several of them offering overnight accommodations.

Sula Vineyard, Samba wine, Samba Wine and Chateau d'Ori in Nasik, Maharashtra, Chateau Indage Narayangaon, as well as Grover Vineyard in Nandi Hills, Karnataka are some of the popular wine tourism destinations in India. Famous Winefest is held in Sula, in February every year. Ten thousands of people visit this famous wine carnival every year.

Activities

Most visits to the wineries take place at or near the site where the wine is produced. Visitors typically learn the history of the winery, see how the wine is made, and then taste the wines. At some wineries, staying in a small guest house at the winery is also offered. Many visitors buy the wines made by the winery at the premises, accounting for up to 33% of their annual sales.

Very small, low production regions such as Priorat, Catalonia focus on small, intimate visits with the owner as the host and include walks through the vineyards to help visitors understand the unique qualities of the region.

More elaborate tastings can include horizontal and vertical tastings as well as full meals focused upon showcasing the wines.

As the enotourism industry matures, additional activities have been added to visits such as riding electrically assisted bicycles, called, "burricleta".

Harvest experience tours, also known as "harvest internships" or "crush camps," are tours or programs that allow visitors to experience the winemaking process firsthand by participating in the grape harvesting and crushing process. These tours are usually offered during the grape harvesting season, which varies depending on the region and the type of grapes being harvested. Harvest experience tours can be a fun and educational way to learn about the winemaking process and to see behind the scenes at a working winery. The winery benefits from essentially free labor during the most demanding periods of wine production while participants may later be able to enjoy wines they personally had a hand in creating.

Other experiences include "wine and food pairing" tours, where visitors can learn about the art of pairing different wines with specific dishes, and cooking classes.

Future
Most tourism agencies see it as a segment of the industry with tremendous growth potential, stating that in some regions, it's only functioning at 20% of its full potential.

As enotourism grows, regions such as Napa Valley have to deal with continued success and the effects that come with it, such as crowds and increased tasting room fees. This can, in turn have the opposite effect desired wherein potential visitors are driven away and turned off enotourism.

Many wine tourists are increasingly interested in visiting wineries that use sustainable practices and are environmentally responsible.

References

Further reading
 J Carlsen, S Charters, Edith Cowan University (editors), Global Wine Tourism, Cabi Publishing (2006) 
 C Michael Hall, Brock Cambourne, Liz Sharples, Niki Macionis, Wine Tourism Around the World: Development, Management and Markets, Elsevier 2000 
 Valduga (2014). "El enoturismo en Brasil Un análisis territorial en el Estado de Rio Grande do Sul (Brasil) desde 1870 hasta 1970". Estudios y perspectivas en turismo. 23 (2): 278–304.

External links

 Rome wine Tours

Wine terminology
Types of tourism